The 2018–19 UC Santa Barbara Guachos men's basketball team represented the University of California, Santa Barbara in the 2018–19 NCAA Division I men's basketball season. The Gauchos were led by second-year head coach Joe Pasternack and competed in The Thunderdome. UC Santa Barbara was a member of the Big West Conference, and participated in their 48th season in that league.

Before the season

The Gauchos finished the season 23–9 overall, and 11–5 in the conference. During the season, the Gauchos participated in the Legends Classic under the subregionals division, which was held in Pittsburgh, Pennsylvania, College Station, Texas, and Las Vegas, Nevada. The Gauchos finished as champions by defeating Pepperdine and Montana. Prior to the tournament, UC Santa Barbara lost at Pittsburgh and at Texas A&M as friendly matches. In the postseason, UC Santa Barbara defeated rival Cal Poly but lost to UC Irvine in the semifinals of the 2018 Big West Conference men's basketball tournament in Anaheim, California.

Roster

Schedule

|-
!colspan=12 style=""| Non–conference regular season

|-
!colspan=12 style=""| Big West regular season

|-
!colspan=12 style=""| Big West tournament

References

UC Santa Barbara
UC Santa Barbara Gauchos men's basketball seasons
UC Santa Barbara
UC Santa Barbara